Philipp Harnoncourt or Philipp Graf de la Fontaine und d'Harnoncourt-Unverzagt (9 February 1931 – 25 May 2020) was an Austrian theologian, priest and musician. Born into a noble family, he grew up in Graz and decided to become a priest at age 17. He studied in Graz and Munich. In 1963 he founded a department of church music at the later Kunstuniversität Graz. He was appointed professor at the University of Graz in 1972 and was head of the institute of liturgics, Christian art and hymnology until his retirement in 1999.

Inspired by the Second Vatican Council, he contributed to the first common Catholic hymnal in German, Gotteslob, and supported ecumenism especially with Orthodox Churches, as a member of the board of Pro Oriente from 1986. He focused on the Trinity, founded the art prize 1+1+1=1 for new works related to the concept, and initiated the restoration of a chapel first dedicated to the Trinity.

Life 
Philipp Harnoncourt was born into nobility in Berlin, the son of Eberhard Harnoncourt (1896–1970) and Ladislaja Johanna Franziska née Gräfin von Meran, Freiin von Brandhoven. He moved with his family to Graz in 1931, living in the family residence . With his brother Nikolaus, he played piano four-hands as a little boy. Both were altar boys at the Graz Cathedral and were thus exposed to church music. When bombing became a threat at the end of 1944, the family moved to Grundlsee.

After World War II, they returned to Graz and Philipp decided to become a priest at age 17. After years as a chaplain in Arnfels and Hartberg, he became secretary of the bishop of Graz, in 1959.

In 1963, Harnoncourt founded a department for church music which became later part of the Kunstuniversität Graz. He was its director for nine years.  He was appointed professor at the University of Graz in 1972, and served until his retirement in 1999 as head of the institute of liturgics, Christian art and hymnology. In 1975 and 1976, he was also dean of the theological faculty of the Graz University.

Harnoncourt is regarded as an influential liturgist after the Second Vatican Council. He promoted the changes in the liturgy, in theological reflection of services, and a strong ecumenical approach. He contributed to the first common Catholic hymnal in German, Gotteslob, which appeared in 1975, and published over 500 works.

Harnoncourt was also instrumental in the ecumenism of Catholics and the orthodox churches.  He worked in the Graz section of Pro Oriente until his death, and was its honorary president. He was awarded an honorary doctorate in Orthodox Theology from the Lucian Blaga University of Sibiu in Romania in 1997. Harnoncourt developed a system of evaluating new church buildings and restoration of churches, called "Steirisches Modell", which is unique to Austria.

Harnoncourt's interest in the Trinity 
Harnoncourt was focused on the Trinity. Feeling that religious beliefs can be expressed better in art than in words, he created an art prize on the occasion of his 80th birthday. Named 1+1+1=1, it has been awarded for new works in the visual arts, literature and music focused on the Trinity. In response, Bertl Muetter composed 1+1+1=1 (discursus trinitatis) for three groups of musicians, which premiered in 2011 at the Graz Cathedral and was dedicated to Harnoncourt. Harnoncourt co-edited and published a book of collected reflections in 2011.

In 2011 he founded, supported by his five siblings, an association to rescue and restore a chapel, the late-Gothic Heiligen-Geist-Kapelle in Bruck an der Mur. The building was originally dedicated to the Trinity and has an unusual triangular floor plan. It was desecrated in 1794, and after that it deteriorated. He said:
  The restored building was inaugurated on 7 June 2020, Trinity Sunday that year, Harnoncourt had hoped to have the Chapel completed by that day.

Death and burial 
Harnoncourt died on 25 May 2020 in Grundlsee. The Requiem was held in the garden of House Meran there, led by Matthias Keil, a relative. Among the guests were Franz Lackner, the arch-bishop of Salzburg, and Wilhelm Krautwaschl, bishop of Graz-Seckau The motto was taken from a letter by a Romanian professor; she had written "Ich kann nicht trauern, weil ich so dankbar bin." (I can not mourn because I am so grateful.") Harnoncourt was buried in Grundlsee in the grave of Albrecht of Meran, his great-uncle.

Awards 

 1997 Honorary doctorate of the Lucian Blaga University of Sibiu
 1997 Domkapitular of the cathedral chapter of the Graz Cathedral
 Austrian Decoration for Science and Art

Composition 
 Gotteslob No. 38.1: "Der Herr ist mein Licht und mein Heil" to Psalm 27

Publications 
 Die Kirchenmusik und das II. Vatikanische Konzil, Styria 1965
 Katechese und Liturgie, Styria 1965, 
 Gesamtkirchliche und teilkirchliche Liturgie, Herder Verlag 1974, 
 with Walter Brunner, : Steirische Kalvarienberge, Andreas Schnider Verlags-Atelier 1990, 
 with  OSB, Clemens Thoma: Vom Sinn der Liturgie, Patmos 1991, 
 Funktion und Zeichen. Kirchenbau in der Steiermark seit dem II. Vatikanum, Andreas Schnider Verlags-Atelier 1992, 
 Liturgie der Kirche, ein gesamtkirchliches und ein ortskirchliches Geschehen, Graz 1993
 with : Theologien im Dialog: gemeinsame Verantwortung – gemeinsame Aufgaben im südosteuropäischen Raum. Begegnung Jüdischer, Christlicher und Islamischer Theologischer Fakultäten und Hochschulen aus dem Südosteuropäischen Raum, Inst. für Ökumenische Theologie und Patrologie Graz 1994, 
 Heilige als Brückenbauer: Heiligenverehrung im ökumenischen Dialog, EOS Verlag 1997, 
 Kostbar ist der Tag, Manumedia Schnider Verlag 2000, 
 Gott feiern in versöhnter Verschiedenheit: Aufsätze zur Liturgie, zur Spiritualität und zur Ökumene, Herder 2005, 

Notes

References

Further reading 

 Dass eure Frucht bleibt. Abschied vom Theologen Philipp Harnoncourt in vielfältiger großer Dankbarkeit. In: Sonntagsblatt für Steiermark, Nr. 24, Graz, 14 June 2020, p. 15.
 
 Norbert Swoboda: Harmonischer Dreiklang: Kirchenbau, sakrale Musik und geistliches Drama. In: Unizeit. Magazin der Karl-Franzens-Universität Graz, Heft 1, Graz 1997, pp. 18–19 (Artikel Online (PDF), retrieved 28 January 2020).

External links 

 Hein Bruns: Descendants of Archduke Johann of Austria, heinbruins.nl 
 

20th-century Austrian Roman Catholic priests
21st-century Austrian Roman Catholic priests
Academic staff of the University of Graz
20th-century Austrian musicians
20th-century Austrian male musicians
21st-century Austrian musicians
Counts of Austria
20th-century non-fiction writers
21st-century non-fiction writers
People in Christian ecumenism
Clergy from Berlin
Writers from Berlin
1931 births
2020 deaths
Harnoncourt family